Adhaury da Costa Rocha (14 May 1920 – 4 February 1981) was a Brazilian sports shooter. He competed in the 25 metre pistol event at the 1956 Summer Olympics.

He was the brother of fellow sports shooter Amaury Rocha.

References

External links
 

1920 births
1981 deaths
Brazilian male sport shooters
Olympic shooters of Brazil
Shooters at the 1956 Summer Olympics
Place of birth missing
Pan American Games medalists in shooting
Pan American Games silver medalists for Brazil
Shooters at the 1951 Pan American Games
20th-century Brazilian people